Forbon is a vulcanized fiber that was created in the early 1900s by the NVF company. It was used on the original pickups that Leo Fender (founder of Fender Guitars) created for the Stratocaster, Telecaster, and the Precision Bass. It is still used on reissue guitar and bass models from that era. Lollar Pickups and The Seymour Duncan Pickup Company also use Forbon on many of their pickups, such as early Fender style replacement pickups. Forbon is still sold by the NVF company.

Fibers
Guitars